Blues & Roots is an album by Charles Mingus, recorded in 1959 and released on the Atlantic label in 1960. It has been reissued on CD by both Atlantic and Rhino.

Inspiration
Mingus explained the origins of this record in the album's liner notes:

Reception
Q Magazine (7/93, p. 110) - 4 Stars - Excellent - "...at his best he could drive his fellow musicians onwards and upwards with big bass playing and hoarse exhortations. Blues & Roots contains six servings of this brilliance..."
DownBeat (1960) - 4 Stars - Very Good - "...vital and important music...[Mingus] is outstanding in his solo work...this is something worth careful and thorough listening..."

Track listing
 "Wednesday Night Prayer Meeting" – 5:39
 "Cryin' Blues" – 4:58
 "Moanin'" – 8:01
 "Tensions" – 6:27
 "My Jelly Roll Soul" – 6:47
 "E's Flat Ah's Flat Too" – 6:37

The 1998 Rhino CD reissue included these additional tracks:

 "Wednesday Night Prayer Meeting"  – 6:59 – alternate take
 "Tensions" – 5:18 – alternate take
 "My Jelly Roll Soul" – 11:25 – alternate take
 "E's Flat Ah's Flat Too" – 6:47 – alternate take
All tracks composed by Charles Mingus. Recorded February 4, 1959, at Atlantic Studios in New York City.

Personnel
 Charles Mingus – bass
 John Handy – alto saxophone
 Jackie McLean – alto saxophone
 Booker Ervin – tenor saxophone
 Pepper Adams – baritone saxophone
 Jimmy Knepper – trombone
 Willie Dennis – trombone
 Dannie Richmond – drums
 Horace Parlan – piano, except for on "E's Flat Ah's Flat Too"
 Mal Waldron – piano on "E's Flat Ah's Flat Too"
 Nesuhi Ertegun – producer
 Tom Dowd – recording engineer

References

Sources
Sleeve notes to Atlantic Records CD reissue of Blues & Roots (Atlantic SD-1305-2)

1960 albums
Post-bop albums
Avant-garde jazz albums
Charles Mingus albums
Atlantic Records albums
Albums produced by Nesuhi Ertegun